Beóán of Mortlach is the first of the three known Bishops of Mortlach. His name, which could also be written in non-Gaelic contexts as Beanus, Beoanus and Beyn, means "lively one". Walter Bower, following John of Fordun, tells us that the bishopric was founded by king Máel Coluim II of Scotland in the seventh year of his reign (1012 AD) as thanks to God for victories over the Scandinavians, and tells us that "the first bishop was Beyn, a saintly man, worthy of the episcopal office, elevated to this see by the Lord Pope Benedict VIII at the king's request". The Aberdeen Registrum records a charter granted to Bishop Beóán by King Máel Coluim at Forfar, granting the bishop the churches and lands of Clova and the unidentified Dulmech. The Aberdeen Breviary commemorated "Bishop Beóán" (Beyn episcopus) as a saint on 26 October. Another Beóán, perhaps the one mentioned in the Life of St. Cathróe of Metz, was commemorated on 16 December, and the two were often confused.

Notes

References
 Innes, Cosmo, Registrum episcopatus Aberdonensis : ecclesie Cathedralis Aberdonensis regesta que extant in unum collecta, 2 Vols, (Spalding and Maitland Clubs, 1845), Vol. II
 Lawrie, Sir Archibald, Early Scottish Charters Prior to A.D. 1153, (Glasgow, 1905)
 MacQueen, John, MacQueen, Winifred & Watt, D.E.R. (eds.), Scottichronicon by Walter Bower in Latin and English, Vol. 2, (Aberdeen, 1989)
 Skene, William Forbes, Celtic Scotland: A History of Ancient Alban, 2nd ed., (Edinburgh, 1887), vol. ii
 Watson, W.J., The Celtic Place-Names of Scotland, (Edinburgh, 1926) reprinted, with an Introduction, full Watson bibliography and corrigenda by Simon Taylor (Edinburgh, 2004)

Further reading
 

10th-century births
11th-century deaths
Medieval Gaels from Scotland
11th-century Scottish Roman Catholic bishops